Zhongxin is a town in Daozhen Gelao and Miao Autonomous County, Guizhou, China.

Administrative division
As of 2016, the town is divided into seven villages: 
 Xinhua 
 Minxing 
 Shisun 
 Xinmin 
 Ganshuwan 
 Shuishijiao 
 Shanyan

Geography
The Furong River  flows through the town. 

The town enjoys a subtropical humid monsoon climate, enjoying four distinct seasons and abundant precipitation.

Economy
The town's economy is based on nearby mineral resources and agricultural resources. The main mineral resources are lead-zinc, pyrite and bauxite. Medicinal materials and tobacco are the main economic crops.

References

Bibliography

Towns of Zunyi